"Man Against the World" is a song by American rock band Survivor. It was the fourth track and the third single released from their 1986 album When Seconds Count. The song was originally to be included on the soundtrack to the 1985 film Rocky IV, but was ultimately cut from the final tracklist. The song did appear as a bonus track on the 2006 reissue of the Rocky IV soundtrack album, along with Survivor's two other Rocky-related singles - the #1 hit "Eye of the Tiger" (the smash hit from Rocky III) and "Burning Heart," which was the song ultimately chosen for the Rocky IV soundtrack and peaked at #2.

The B-side of the single, "Oceans" also appeared on the When Seconds Count album as the sixth track.

Weekly charts

References 

1986 songs
1987 singles
Survivor (band) songs
Songs written by Frankie Sullivan
Songs written by Jim Peterik
Scotti Brothers Records singles
Songs written by Jimi Jamison